Botin or Botín may refer to:

People
Ana Patricia Botín (born 1960), Spanish banker
Emilio Botín (1903–1993), Spanish banker
Emilio Botín (1934–2014), Spanish banker
Jaime Botín (born c. 1936), Spanish billionaire heir and banker
Vicente Botín, Spanish journalist

Other
Botin, a mount in Kurdistan
Botin River, a river in Romania.
Sobrino de Botín, a restaurant in Madrid, Spain, founded in 1725
Bohutín (Šumperk District), a village in the Czech Republic
Botines, Texas, a small town in Texas